Phaulostylus is a genus of Malagasy jumping spiders that was first described by Eugène Louis Simon in 1902.

Species
 it contains four species, found only on Madagascar:
Phaulostylus furcifer Simon, 1902 (type) – Madagascar
Phaulostylus grammicus Simon, 1902 – Madagascar
Phaulostylus grandidieri Simon, 1902 – Madagascar
Phaulostylus leucolophus Simon, 1902 – Madagascar

References

Salticidae genera
Salticidae
Spiders of Madagascar
Taxa named by Eug%C3%A8ne Simon